Personality disorders (PD) are a class of mental disorders characterized by enduring maladaptive patterns of behavior, cognition, and inner experience, exhibited across many contexts and deviating from those accepted by the individual's culture. These patterns develop early, are inflexible, and are associated with significant distress or disability. The definitions vary by source and remain a matter of controversy. Official criteria for diagnosing personality disorders are listed in the sixth chapter of the International Classification of Diseases (ICD) and in the American Psychiatric Association's Diagnostic and Statistical Manual of Mental Disorders (DSM).

Personality, defined psychologically, is the set of enduring behavioral and mental traits that distinguish individual humans. Hence, personality disorders are defined by experiences and behaviors that deviate from social norms and expectations. Those diagnosed with a personality disorder may experience difficulties in cognition, emotiveness, interpersonal functioning, or impulse control. For psychiatric patients, the prevalence of personality disorders is estimated between 40 and 60%. The behavior patterns of personality disorders are typically recognized by adolescence, the beginning of adulthood or sometimes even childhood and often have a pervasive negative impact on the quality of life.

Treatment for personality disorders is primarily psychotherapeutic. Evidence-based psychotherapies for personality disorders include cognitive behavioral therapy, and dialectical behavior therapy especially for borderline personality disorder. A variety of psychoanalytic approaches are also used.

Personality disorders are associated with considerable stigma in popular and clinical discourse alike. Despite various methodological schemas designed to categorize personality disorders, many issues occur with classifying a personality disorder because the theory and diagnosis of such disorders occur within prevailing cultural expectations; thus, their validity is contested by some experts on the basis of inevitable subjectivity. They argue that the theory and diagnosis of personality disorders are based strictly on social, or even sociopolitical and economic considerations.

Classification and symptoms 
The two latest editions of the major systems of classification are:
 the International Classification of Diseases (11th revision, ICD-11) published by the World Health Organization
 the Diagnostic and Statistical Manual of Mental Disorders (Fifth Edition, DSM-5) by the American Psychiatric Association.

The ICD is a collection of alpha-numerical codes which have been assigned to all known clinical states, and provides uniform terminology for medical records, billing, statistics and research. The DSM defines psychiatric diagnoses based on research and expert consensus. Both have deliberately aligned their diagnoses to some extent, but some differences remain. For example, the ICD-10 included narcissistic personality disorder in the group of other specific personality disorders, while DSM-5 does not include enduring personality change after catastrophic experience. The ICD-10 classified the DSM-5 schizotypal personality disorder as a form of schizophrenia rather than as a personality disorder. There are accepted diagnostic issues and controversies with regard to distinguishing particular personality disorder categories from each other. Dissociative identity disorder, previously known as multiple personality as well as multiple personality disorder, has always been classified as a dissociative disorder and never was regarded as a personality disorder.

DSM-5 
The most recent fifth edition of the Diagnostic and Statistical Manual of Mental Disorders stresses that a personality disorder is an enduring and inflexible pattern of long duration leading to significant distress or impairment and is not due to use of substances or another medical condition. The DSM-5 lists personality disorders in the same way as other mental disorders, rather than on a separate 'axis', as previously.

DSM-5 lists ten specific personality disorders: paranoid, schizoid, schizotypal, antisocial, borderline, histrionic, narcissistic, avoidant, dependent and obsessive–compulsive personality disorder.

The DSM-5 also contains three diagnoses for personality patterns not matching these ten disorders, but nevertheless exhibit characteristics of a personality disorder:
 Personality change due to another medical condition – personality disturbance due to the direct effects of a medical condition.
 Other specified personality disorder – general criteria for a personality disorder are met but fails to meet the criteria for a specific disorder, with the reason given.
 Unspecified personality disorder – general criteria for a personality disorder are met but the personality disorder is not included in the DSM-5 classification.
These specific personality disorders are grouped into the following three clusters based on descriptive similarities:

Cluster A (odd or eccentric disorders) 
Cluster A personality disorders are often associated with schizophrenia: in particular, schizotypal personality disorder shares some of its hallmark symptoms with schizophrenia, e.g., acute discomfort in close relationships, cognitive or perceptual distortions, and eccentricities of behavior. However, people diagnosed with odd-eccentric personality disorders tend to have a greater grasp on reality than those with schizophrenia. People with these disorders can be paranoid and have difficulty being understood by others, as they often have odd or eccentric modes of speaking and an unwillingness and inability to form and maintain close relationships. Though their perceptions may be unusual, these anomalies are distinguished from delusions or hallucinations as people with these would be diagnosed with other conditions. Significant evidence suggests a small proportion of people with Cluster A personality disorders, especially schizotypal personality disorder, have the potential to develop schizophrenia and other psychotic disorders. These disorders also have a higher probability of occurring among individuals whose first-degree relatives have either schizophrenia or a Cluster A personality disorder.
 Paranoid personality disorder: characterized by a pattern of irrational suspicion and mistrust of others, interpreting motivations as malevolent.
 Schizoid personality disorder: exhibiting a cold affect and detachment from social relationships, apathy, and restricted emotional expression.
 Schizotypal personality disorder: pattern of extreme discomfort interacting socially, and distorted cognition and perceptions.

Cluster B (dramatic, emotional or erratic disorders) 
Cluster B personality disorders are characterized by dramatic, impulsive, self-destructive, emotional behavior and sometimes incomprehensible interactions with others.

 Antisocial personality disorder: pervasive pattern of disregard for and violation of the rights of others, lack of empathy, callousness, bloated self-image, manipulative and impulsive behavior.
 Borderline personality disorder: pervasive pattern of abrupt emotional outbursts, altered empathy, instability in relationships, self-image, identity, behavior and affect, often leading to self-harm and impulsivity.
 Histrionic personality disorder: pervasive pattern of attention-seeking behavior, including excessive emotions, an impressionistic style of speech, inappropriate seduction, exhibitionism, and egocentrism.
 Narcissistic personality disorder: pervasive pattern of superior grandiosity, haughtiness, need for admiration, deceiving others, and a lack of empathy. In a more severe expression, criminal behavior is present, but such individuals are remorseful.

Cluster C (anxious or fearful disorders) 
 Avoidant personality disorder: pervasive feelings of social inhibition and inadequacy, extreme sensitivity to negative evaluation.
 Dependent personality disorder: pervasive psychological need to be cared for by other people.
 Obsessive–compulsive personality disorder: characterized by rigid conformity to rules, perfectionism, and control to the point of satisfaction and exclusion of leisurely activities and friendships (distinct from obsessive–compulsive disorder).

DSM-5 general criteria 
Both the DSM-5 and the ICD-11 diagnostic systems provide a definition and six criteria for a general personality disorder. These criteria should be met by all personality disorder cases before a more specific diagnosis can be made.

The DSM-5 indicates that any personality disorder diagnosis must meet the following criteria:
 An enduring pattern of inner experience and behavior that deviates markedly from the expectations of the individual's culture. This pattern is manifested in two (or more) of the following areas:
 Cognition (i.e., ways of perceiving and interpreting self, other people, and events).
 Affectivity (i.e., the range, intensity, lability, and appropriateness of emotional response).
 Interpersonal functioning.
 Impulse control.
 The enduring pattern is inflexible and pervasive across a broad range of personal and social situations.
 The enduring pattern leads to clinically significant distress or impairment in social, occupational, or other important areas of functioning.
 The pattern is stable and of long duration, and its onset can be traced back at least to adolescence or early adulthood.
 The enduring pattern is not better explained as a manifestation or consequence of another mental disorder.
 The enduring pattern is not attributable to the physiological effects of a substance (e.g., a drug of abuse, a medication) or another medical condition (e.g., head trauma).

ICD-11 

The ICD-11 personality disorder section differs substantially compared to the previous edition ICD-10. All distinct PDs have been merged into one: Personality disorder, which can be coded as Mild, Moderate, Severe, or severity unspecified. There is also an additional category called Personality difficulty, which can be used to describe personality traits that are problematic, but do not meet the diagnostic criteria for a PD. A personality disorder or difficulty can be specified by one or more Prominent personality traits or patterns. The ICD-11 uses five trait domains:
 Negative affectivity - including anxiety, separation insecurity, distrustfulness, worthlessness and emotional instability
 Detachment - including social detachment and emotional coldness
 Dissociality - including grandiosity, egocentricity, deception, exploitativeness and aggression
 Disinhibition - including risk-taking, impulsivity, irresponsibility and distractibility
 Anankastia - including rigid control over behaviour and affect and rigid perfectionism.
Listed directly underneath is Borderline pattern, a category similar to Borderline personality disorder. This is not a trait in itself, but a combination of the five traits in certain severity.

In the ICD-11, any personality disorder must meet all of the following criteria:

 An enduring disturbance characterized by problems in functioning of aspects of the self (e.g., identity, self-worth, accuracy of self-view, self-direction), and/or interpersonal dysfunction (e.g., ability to develop and maintain close and mutually satisfying relationships, ability to understand others' perspectives and to manage conflict in relationships).
 The disturbance has persisted over an extended period of time (e.g., lasting 2 years or more).
 The disturbance is manifest in patterns of cognition, emotional experience, emotional expression, and behaviour that are maladaptive (e.g., inflexible or poorly regulated).
 The disturbance is manifest across a range of personal and social situations (i.e., is not limited to specific relationships or social roles), though it may be consistently evoked by particular types of circumstances and not others.
 The symptoms are not due to the direct effects of a medication or substance, including withdrawal effects, and are not better accounted for by another mental disorder, a Disease of the Nervous System, or another medical condition.
 The disturbance is associated with substantial distress or significant impairment in personal, family, social, educational, occupational or other important areas of functioning.
 Personality Disorder should not be diagnosed if the patterns of behaviour characterizing the personality disturbance are developmentally appropriate (e.g., problems related to establishing an independent self-identity during adolescence) or can be explained primarily by social or cultural factors, including socio-political conflict.

ICD-10 
The ICD-10 lists these general guideline criteria:
 Markedly disharmonious attitudes and behavior, generally involving several areas of functioning, e.g. affectivity, arousal, impulse control, ways of perceiving and thinking, and style of relating to others;
 The abnormal behavior pattern is enduring, of long standing, and not limited to episodes of mental illness;
 The abnormal behavior pattern is pervasive and clearly maladaptive to a broad range of personal and social situations;
 The above manifestations always appear during childhood or adolescence and continue into adulthood;
 The disorder leads to considerable personal distress but this may only become apparent late in its course;
 The disorder is usually, but not invariably, associated with significant problems in occupational and social performance.
The ICD adds: "For different cultures it may be necessary to develop specific sets of criteria with regard to social norms, rules and obligations."

Chapter V in the ICD-10 contains the mental and behavioral disorders and includes categories of personality disorder and enduring personality changes. They are defined as ingrained patterns indicated by inflexible and disabling responses that significantly differ from how the average person in the culture perceives, thinks, and feels, particularly in relating to others.

The specific personality disorders are: paranoid, schizoid, schizotypal, dissocial, emotionally unstable (borderline type and impulsive type), histrionic, narcissistic, anankastic, anxious (avoidant) and dependent.

Besides the ten specific PD, there are the following categories:
 Other specific personality disorders (involves PD characterized as eccentric, haltlose, immature, narcissistic, passive–aggressive, or psychoneurotic.)
 Personality disorder, unspecified (includes "character neurosis" and "pathological personality").
 Mixed and other personality disorders (defined as conditions that are often troublesome but do not demonstrate the specific pattern of symptoms in the named disorders).
 Enduring personality changes, not attributable to brain damage and disease (this is for conditions that seem to arise in adults without a diagnosis of personality disorder, following catastrophic or prolonged stress or other psychiatric illness).

Other personality types and Millon's description 
Some types of personality disorder were in previous versions of the diagnostic manuals but have been deleted. Examples include sadistic personality disorder (pervasive pattern of cruel, demeaning, and aggressive behavior) and self-defeating personality disorder or masochistic personality disorder (characterized by behavior consequently undermining the person's pleasure and goals). They were listed in the DSM-III-R appendix as "Proposed diagnostic categories needing further study" without specific criteria. Psychologist Theodore Millon, a researcher on personality disorders, and other researchers consider some relegated diagnoses to be equally valid disorders, and may also propose other personality disorders or subtypes, including mixtures of aspects of different categories of the officially accepted diagnoses. Millon proposed the following description of personality disorders:

Additional factors 
In addition to classifying by category and cluster, it is possible to classify personality disorders using additional factors such as severity, impact on social functioning, and attribution.

Severity 
This involves both the notion of personality difficulty as a measure of subthreshold scores for personality disorder using standard interviews and the evidence that those with the most severe personality disorders demonstrate a “ripple effect” of personality disturbance across the whole range of mental disorders. In addition to subthreshold (personality difficulty) and single cluster (simple personality disorder), this also derives complex or diffuse personality disorder (two or more clusters of personality disorder present) and can also derive severe personality disorder for those of greatest risk.

There are several advantages to classifying personality disorder by severity:
 It not only allows for but also takes advantage of the tendency for personality disorders to be comorbid with each other.
 It represents the influence of personality disorder on clinical outcome more satisfactorily than the simple dichotomous system of no personality disorder versus personality disorder.
 This system accommodates the new diagnosis of severe personality disorder, particularly "dangerous and severe personality disorder" (DSPD).

Effect on social functioning 
Social function is affected by many other aspects of mental functioning apart from that of personality. However, whenever there is persistently impaired social functioning in conditions in which it would normally not be expected, the evidence suggests that this is more likely to be created by personality abnormality than by other clinical variables. The Personality Assessment Schedule gives social function priority in creating a hierarchy in which the personality disorder creating the greater social dysfunction is given primacy over others in a subsequent description of personality disorder.

Attribution 
Many who have a personality disorder do not recognize any abnormality and defend valiantly their continued occupancy of their personality role. This group have been termed the Type R, or treatment-resisting personality disorders, as opposed to the Type S or treatment-seeking ones, who are keen on altering their personality disorders and sometimes clamor for treatment. The classification of 68 personality disordered patients on the caseload of an assertive community team using a simple scale showed a 3 to 1 ratio between Type R and Type S personality disorders with Cluster C personality disorders being significantly more likely to be Type S, and paranoid and schizoid (Cluster A) personality disorders significantly more likely to be Type R than others.

Psychoanalytic theory has been used to explain treatment-resistant tendencies as egosyntonic (i.e. the patterns are consistent with the ego integrity of the individual) and are therefore perceived to be appropriate by that individual. In addition, this behavior can result in maladaptive coping skills and may lead to personal problems that induce extreme anxiety, distress, or depression and result in impaired psychosocial functioning.

Presentation

Comorbidity 

There is a considerable personality disorder diagnostic co-occurrence. Patients who meet the DSM-IV-TR diagnostic criteria for one personality disorder are likely to meet the diagnostic criteria for another. Diagnostic categories provide clear, vivid descriptions of discrete personality types but the personality structure of actual patients might be more accurately described by a constellation of maladaptive personality traits.

Sites used DSM-III-R criterion sets. Data obtained for purposes of informing the development of the DSM-IV-TR personality disorder diagnostic criteria.

Abbreviations used: PPD – Paranoid Personality Disorder, SzPD – Schizoid Personality Disorder, StPD – Schizotypal Personality Disorder, ASPD – Antisocial Personality Disorder, BPD – Borderline Personality Disorder, HPD – Histrionic Personality Disorder, NPD – Narcissistic Personality Disorder, AvPD – Avoidant Personality Disorder, DPD – Dependent Personality Disorder, OCPD – Obsessive–Compulsive Personality Disorder, PAPD – Passive–Aggressive Personality Disorder.

The disorders in each of the three clusters may share with each other underlying common vulnerability factors involving cognition, affect and impulse control, and behavioral maintenance or inhibition, respectively. But they may also have a spectrum relationship to certain syndromal mental disorders:
 Paranoid, schizoid or schizotypal personality disorders may be observed to be premorbid antecedents of delusional disorders or schizophrenia.
 Borderline personality disorder is seen in association with mood and anxiety disorders, with impulse-control disorders, eating disorders, ADHD, ASD, or a substance use disorder.
 Avoidant personality disorder is seen with social anxiety disorder.

Impact on functioning 
It is generally assumed that all personality disorders are linked to impaired functioning and a reduced quality of life (QoL) because that is a basic diagnostic requirement. But research shows that this may be true only for some types of personality disorder.

In several studies, higher levels of disability and lower QoL were predicted by avoidant, dependent, schizoid, paranoid, schizotypal and antisocial personality disorders. This link is particularly strong for avoidant, schizotypal and borderline PD. However, obsessive–compulsive PD was not related to a reduced QoL or increased impairment. A prospective study reported that all PD were associated with significant impairment 15 years later, except for obsessive compulsive and narcissistic personality disorder.

One study investigated some aspects of "life success" (status, wealth and successful intimate relationships). It showed somewhat poor functioning for schizotypal, antisocial, borderline and dependent PD, schizoid PD had the lowest scores regarding these variables. Paranoid, histrionic and avoidant PD were average. Narcissistic and obsessive–compulsive PD, however, had high functioning and appeared to contribute rather positively to these aspects of life success.

There is also a direct relationship between the number of diagnostic criteria and quality of life. For each additional personality disorder criterion that a person meets there is an even reduction in quality of life. Personality disorders - especially dependent, narcissistic, and sadistic personality disorders - also facilitate various forms of counterproductive work behavior, including knowledge hiding and knowledge sabotage.

Issues

In the workplace 
Depending on the diagnosis, severity and individual, and the job itself, personality disorders can be associated with difficulty coping with work or the workplace—potentially leading to problems with others by interfering with interpersonal relationships. Indirect effects also play a role; for example, impaired educational progress or complications outside of work, such as substance abuse and co-morbid mental disorders, can be problematic. However, personality disorders can also bring about above-average work abilities by increasing competitive drive or causing the individual with the condition to exploit his or her co-workers.

In 2005 and again in 2009, psychologists Belinda Board and Katarina Fritzon at the University of Surrey, UK, interviewed and gave personality tests to high-level British executives and compared their profiles with those of criminal psychiatric patients at Broadmoor Hospital in the UK. They found that three out of eleven personality disorders were actually more common in executives than in the disturbed criminals:
 Histrionic personality disorder: including superficial charm, insincerity, egocentricity and manipulation
 Narcissistic personality disorder: including grandiosity, self-focused lack of empathy for others, exploitativeness and independence.
 Obsessive–compulsive personality disorder: including perfectionism, excessive devotion to work, rigidity, stubbornness and dictatorial tendencies.

According to leadership academic Manfred F.R. Kets de Vries, it seems almost inevitable that some personality disorders will be present in a senior management team.

In children 

Early stages and preliminary forms of personality disorders need a multi-dimensional and early treatment approach. Personality development disorder is considered to be a childhood risk factor or early stage of a later personality disorder in adulthood.
In addition, in Robert F. Krueger's review of their research indicates that some children and adolescents do experience clinically significant syndromes that resemble adult personality disorders, and that these syndromes have meaningful correlates and are consequential. Much of this research has been framed by the adult personality disorder constructs from Axis II of the Diagnostic and Statistical Manual. Hence, they are less likely to encounter the first risk they described at the outset of their review: clinicians and researchers are not simply avoiding use of the PD construct in youth. However, they may encounter the second risk they described: under-appreciation of the developmental context in which these syndromes occur. That is, although PD constructs show continuity over time, they are probabilistic predictors; not all youths who exhibit PD symptomatology become adult PD cases.

Versus normal personality 
The issue of the relationship between normal personality and personality disorders is one of the important issues in personality and clinical psychology. The personality disorders classification (DSM-5 and ICD-10) follows a categorical approach that views personality disorders as discrete entities that are distinct from each other and from normal personality. In contrast, the dimensional approach is an alternative approach that personality disorders represent maladaptive extensions of the same traits that describe normal personality.

Thomas Widiger and his collaborators have contributed to this debate significantly. He discussed the constraints of the categorical approach and argued for the dimensional approach to the personality disorders. Specifically, he proposed the Five Factor Model of personality as an alternative to the classification of personality disorders. For example, this view specifies that Borderline Personality Disorder can be understood as a combination of emotional lability (i.e., high neuroticism), impulsivity (i.e., low conscientiousness), and hostility (i.e., low agreeableness). Many studies across cultures have explored the relationship between personality disorders and the Five Factor Model. This research has demonstrated that personality disorders largely correlate in expected ways with measures of the Five Factor Model and has set the stage for including the Five Factor Model within DSM-5.

In clinical practice, individuals are generally diagnosed by an interview with a psychiatrist based on a mental status examination, which may take into account observations by relatives and others. One tool of diagnosing personality disorders is a process involving interviews with scoring systems. The patient is asked to answer questions, and depending on their answers, the trained interviewer tries to code what their responses were. This process is fairly time-consuming.

Abbreviations used: PPD – Paranoid Personality Disorder, SzPD – Schizoid Personality Disorder, StPD – Schizotypal Personality Disorder, ASPD – Antisocial Personality Disorder, BPD – Borderline Personality Disorder, HPD – Histrionic Personality Disorder, NPD – Narcissistic Personality Disorder, AvPD – Avoidant Personality Disorder, DPD – Dependent Personality Disorder, OCPD – Obsessive–Compulsive Personality Disorder, PAPD – Passive–Aggressive Personality Disorder, DpPD – Depressive Personality Disorder, SDPD – Self-Defeating Personality Disorder, SaPD – Sadistic Personality Disorder, and n/a – not available.

As of 2002, there were over fifty published studies relating the five factor model (FFM) to personality disorders. Since that time, quite a number of additional studies have expanded on this research base and provided further empirical support for understanding the DSM personality disorders in terms of the FFM domains. In her seminal review of the personality disorder literature published in 2007, Lee Anna Clark asserted that "the five-factor model of personality is widely accepted as representing the higher-order structure of both normal and abnormal personality traits".

The five factor model has been shown to significantly predict all 10 personality disorder symptoms and outperform the Minnesota Multiphasic Personality Inventory (MMPI) in the prediction of borderline, avoidant, and dependent personality disorder symptoms.

Research results examining the relationships between the FFM and each of the ten DSM personality disorder diagnostic categories are widely available. For example, in a study published in 2003 titled "The five-factor model and personality disorder empirical literature: A meta-analytic review", the authors analyzed data from 15 other studies to determine how personality disorders are different and similar, respectively, with regard to underlying personality traits. In terms of how personality disorders differ, the results showed that each disorder displays a FFM profile that is meaningful and predictable given its unique diagnostic criteria. With regard to their similarities, the findings revealed that the most prominent and consistent personality dimensions underlying a large number of the personality disorders are positive associations with neuroticism and negative associations with agreeableness.

Openness to experience 

At least three aspects of openness to experience are relevant to understanding personality disorders: cognitive distortions, lack of insight (means the ability to recognize one's own mental illness here) and impulsivity. Problems related to high openness that can cause problems with social or professional functioning are excessive fantasising, peculiar thinking, diffuse identity, unstable goals and nonconformity with the demands of the society.

High openness is characteristic to schizotypal personality disorder (odd and fragmented thinking), narcissistic personality disorder (excessive self-valuation) and paranoid personality disorder (sensitivity to external hostility). Lack of insight (shows low openness) is characteristic to all personality disorders and could help explain the persistence of maladaptive behavioral patterns.

The problems associated with low openness are difficulties adapting to change, low tolerance for different worldviews or lifestyles, emotional flattening, alexithymia and a narrow range of interests. Rigidity is the most obvious aspect of (low) openness among personality disorders and that shows lack of knowledge of one's emotional experiences. It is most characteristic of obsessive–compulsive personality disorder; the opposite of it known as impulsivity (here: an aspect of openness that shows a tendency to behave unusually or autistically) is characteristic of schizotypal and borderline personality disorders.

Causes 
Currently, there are no definitive proven causes for personality disorders. However, there are numerous possible causes and known risk factors supported by scientific research that vary depending on the disorder, the individual, and the circumstance. Overall, findings show that genetic disposition and life experiences, such as trauma and abuse, play a key role in the development of personality disorders.

Child abuse 
Child abuse and neglect consistently show up as risk factors to the development of personality disorders in adulthood. A study looked at retrospective reports of abuse of participants that had demonstrated psychopathology throughout their life and were later found to have past experience with abuse. In a study of 793 mothers and children, researchers asked mothers if they had screamed at their children, and told them that they did not love them or threatened to send them away. Children who had experienced such verbal abuse were three times as likely as other children (who did not experience such verbal abuse) to have borderline, narcissistic, obsessive–compulsive or paranoid personality disorders in adulthood. The sexually abused group demonstrated the most consistently elevated patterns of psychopathology. Officially verified physical abuse showed an extremely strong correlation with the development of antisocial and impulsive behavior. On the other hand, cases of abuse of the neglectful type that created childhood pathology were found to be subject to partial remission in adulthood.

Socioeconomic status 
Socioeconomic status has also been looked at as a potential cause for personality disorders. There is a strong association with low parental/neighborhood socioeconomic status and personality disorder symptoms. In a 2015 publication from Bonn, Germany, which compared parental socioeconomic status and a child's personality, it was seen that children who were from higher socioeconomic backgrounds were more altruistic, less risk seeking, and had overall higher IQs. These traits correlate with a low risk of developing personality disorders later on in life. In a study looking at female children who were detained for disciplinary actions found that psychological problems were most negatively associated with socioeconomic problems. Furthermore, social disorganization was found to be inversely correlated with personality disorder symptoms.

Parenting 
Evidence shows personality disorders may begin with parental personality issues. These cause the child to have their own difficulties in adulthood, such as difficulties reaching higher education, obtaining jobs, and securing dependable relationships. By either genetic or modeling mechanisms, children can pick up these traits. Additionally, poor parenting appears to have symptom elevating effects on personality disorders. More specifically, lack of maternal bonding has also been correlated with personality disorders. In a study comparing 100 healthy individuals to 100 borderline personality disorder patients, analysis showed that BPD patients were significantly more likely not to have been breastfed as a baby (42.4% in BPD vs. 9.2% in healthy controls). These researchers suggested "Breastfeeding may act as an early indicator of the mother-infant relationship that seems to be relevant for bonding and attachment later in life". Additionally, findings suggest personality disorders show a negative correlation with two attachment variables: maternal availability and dependability. When left unfostered, other attachment and interpersonal problems occur later in life ultimately leading to development of personality disorders.

Genetics 
Currently, genetic research for the understanding of the development of personality disorders is severely lacking. However, there are a few possible risk factors currently in discovery. Researchers are currently looking into genetic mechanisms for traits such as aggression, fear and anxiety, which are associated with diagnosed individuals. More research is being conducted into disorder specific mechanisms.

Neurobiological correlates - hippocampus, amygdala 
Research shows that several brain regions are altered in personality disorders, particularly: hippocampus up to 18% smaller, a smaller amygdala, malfunctions in the striatum-nucleus accumbens and the cingulum neural pathways connecting them and taking care of the feedback loops on what to do with all the incoming information from the multiple senses; so what comes out is anti-social - not according to what is the social norm, socially acceptable and appropriate.

Management

Specific approaches 

There are many different forms (modalities) of treatment used for personality disorders:
 Individual psychotherapy has been a mainstay of treatment. There are long-term and short-term (brief) forms.
 Family therapy, including couples therapy.
 Group therapy for personality dysfunction is probably the second most used.
 Psychological-education may be used as an addition.
 Self-help groups may provide resources for personality disorders.
 Psychiatric medications for treating symptoms of personality dysfunction or co-occurring conditions.
 Milieu therapy, a kind of group-based residential approach, has a history of use in treating personality disorders, including therapeutic communities.
 The practice of mindfulness that includes developing the ability to be nonjudgmentally aware of unpleasant emotions appears to be a promising clinical tool for managing different types of personality disorders.

There are different specific theories or schools of therapy within many of these modalities. They may, for example, emphasize psychodynamic techniques, or cognitive or behavioral techniques. In clinical practice, many therapists use an 'eclectic' approach, taking elements of different schools as and when they seem to fit to an individual client. There is also often a focus on common themes that seem to be beneficial regardless of techniques, including attributes of the therapist (e.g. trustworthiness, competence, caring), processes afforded to the client (e.g. ability to express and confide difficulties and emotions), and the match between the two (e.g. aiming for mutual respect, trust and boundaries).

Despite the lack of evidence supporting the benefit of antipsychotics in people with personality disorders, 1 in 4 who do not have a serious mental illness are prescribed them in UK primary care. Many people receive these medication for over a year, contrary to NICE guidelines.

Challenges 

The management and treatment of personality disorders can be a challenging and controversial area, for by definition the difficulties have been enduring and affect multiple areas of functioning. This often involves interpersonal issues, and there can be difficulties in seeking and obtaining help from organizations in the first place, as well as with establishing and maintaining a specific therapeutic relationship. On the one hand, an individual may not consider themselves to have a mental health problem, while on the other, community mental health services may view individuals with personality disorders as too complex or difficult, and may directly or indirectly exclude individuals with such diagnoses or associated behaviors. The disruptiveness that people with personality disorders can create in an organisation makes these, arguably, the most challenging conditions to manage.

Apart from all these issues, an individual may not consider their personality to be disordered or the cause of problems. This perspective may be caused by the patient's ignorance or lack of insight into their own condition, an ego-syntonic perception of the problems with their personality that prevents them from experiencing it as being in conflict with their goals and self-image, or by the simple fact that there is no distinct or objective boundary between 'normal' and 'abnormal' personalities. There is substantial social stigma and discrimination related to the diagnosis.

The term 'personality disorder' encompasses a wide range of issues, each with a different level of severity or impairment; thus, personality disorders can require fundamentally different approaches and understandings. To illustrate the scope of the matter, consider that while some disorders or individuals are characterized by continual social withdrawal and the shunning of relationships, others may cause fluctuations in forwardness. The extremes are worse still: at one extreme lie self-harm and self-neglect, while at another extreme some individuals may commit violence and crime. There can be other factors such as problematic substance use or dependency or behavioral addictions.

Therapists in this area can become disheartened by lack of initial progress, or by apparent progress that then leads to setbacks. Clients may be perceived as negative, rejecting, demanding, aggressive or manipulative. This has been looked at in terms of both therapist and client; in terms of social skills, coping efforts, defense mechanisms, or deliberate strategies; and in terms of moral judgments or the need to consider underlying motivations for specific behaviors or conflicts. The vulnerabilities of a client, and indeed a therapist, may become lost behind actual or apparent strength and resilience. It is commonly stated that there is always a need to maintain appropriate professional personal boundaries, while allowing for emotional expression and therapeutic relationships. However, there can be difficulty acknowledging the different worlds and views that both the client and therapist may live with. A therapist may assume that the kinds of relationships and ways of interacting that make them feel safe and comfortable have the same effect on clients. As an example of one extreme, people who may have been exposed to hostility, deceptiveness, rejection, aggression or abuse in their lives, may in some cases be made confused, intimidated or suspicious by presentations of warmth, intimacy or positivity. On the other hand, reassurance, openness and clear communication are usually helpful and needed. It can take several months of sessions, and perhaps several stops and starts, to begin to develop a trusting relationship that can meaningfully address a client's issues.

Epidemiology 

The prevalence of personality disorder in the general community was largely unknown until surveys starting from the 1990s. In 2008 the median rate of diagnosable PD was estimated at 10.6%, based on six major studies across three nations. This rate of around one in ten, especially as associated with high use of cocaine, is described as a major public health concern requiring attention by researchers and clinicians.

The prevalence of individual personality disorders ranges from about 2% to 8% for the more common varieties, such as obsessive-compulsive, schizotypal, antisocial, borderline, and histrionic, to 0.5–1% for the least common, such as narcissistic and avoidant.

A screening survey across 13 countries by the World Health Organization using DSM-IV criteria, reported in 2009 a prevalence estimate of around 6% for personality disorders. The rate sometimes varied with demographic and socioeconomic factors, and functional impairment was partly explained by co-occurring mental disorders. In the US, screening data from the National Comorbidity Survey Replication between 2001 and 2003, combined with interviews of a subset of respondents, indicated a population prevalence of around 9% for personality disorders in total. Functional disability associated with the diagnoses appeared to be largely due to co-occurring mental disorders (Axis I in the DSM). This statistic has been supported by other studies in the US, with overall global prevalence statistics ranging from 9% to 11%.

A UK national epidemiological study (based on DSM-IV screening criteria), reclassified into levels of severity rather than just diagnosis, reported in 2010 that the majority of people show some personality difficulties in one way or another (short of threshold for diagnosis), while the prevalence of the most complex and severe cases (including meeting criteria for multiple diagnoses in different clusters) was estimated at 1.3%. Even low levels of personality symptoms were associated with functional problems, but the most severely in need of services was a much smaller group.

Personality disorders (especially Cluster A) are found more commonly among homeless people.

There are some sex differences in the frequency of personality disorders which are shown in the table below. The known prevalence of some personality disorders, especially borderline PD and antisocial PD are affected by diagnostic bias. This is due to many factors including disproportionately high research towards borderline PD and antisocial PD, alongside social and gender stereotypes, and the relationship between diagnosis rates and prevalence rates. Since the removal of depressive PD, self-defeating PD, sadistic PD and passive-aggressive PD from the DSM-5, studies analysing their prevalence and demographics have been limited.

History

Diagnostic and Statistical Manual history

Before the 20th century 
Personality disorder is a term with a distinctly modern meaning, owing in part to its clinical usage and the institutional character of modern psychiatry. The currently accepted meaning must be understood in the context of historical changing classification systems such as DSM-IV and its predecessors. Although highly anachronistic, and ignoring radical differences in the character of subjectivity and social relations, some have suggested similarities to other concepts going back to at least the ancient Greeks. For example, the Greek philosopher Theophrastus described 29 'character' types that he saw as deviations from the norm, and similar views have been found in Asian, Arabic and Celtic cultures. A long-standing influence in the Western world was Galen's concept of personality types, which he linked to the four humours proposed by Hippocrates.

Such views lasted into the eighteenth century, when experiments began to question the supposed biologically based humours and 'temperaments'. Psychological concepts of character and 'self' became widespread. In the nineteenth century, 'personality' referred to a person's conscious awareness of their behavior, a disorder of which could be linked to altered states such as dissociation. This sense of the term has been compared to the use of the term 'multiple personality disorder' in the first versions of the DSM.

Physicians in the early nineteenth century started to diagnose forms of insanity involving disturbed emotions and behaviors but seemingly without significant intellectual impairment or delusions or hallucinations. Philippe Pinel referred to this as ' manie sans délire ' – mania without delusions – and described a number of cases mainly involving excessive or inexplicable anger or rage. James Cowles Prichard advanced a similar concept he called moral insanity, which would be used to diagnose patients for some decades. 'Moral' in this sense referred to affect (emotion or mood) rather than ethics, but it was arguably based in part on religious, social and moral beliefs, with a pessimism about medical intervention so social control should take precedence. These categories were much different and broader than later definitions of personality disorder, while also being developed by some into a more specific meaning of moral degeneracy akin to later ideas about 'psychopaths'. Separately, Richard von Krafft-Ebing popularized the terms sadism and masochism, as well as homosexuality, as psychiatric issues.

The German psychiatrist Koch sought to make the moral insanity concept more scientific, and in 1891 suggested the phrase 'psychopathic inferiority', theorized to be a congenital disorder. This referred to continual and rigid patterns of misconduct or dysfunction in the absence of apparent "mental retardation" or illness, supposedly without a moral judgment. Described as deeply rooted in his Christian faith, his work established the concept of personality disorder as used today.

20th century 
In the early 20th century, another German psychiatrist, Emil Kraepelin, included a chapter on psychopathic inferiority in his influential work on clinical psychiatry for students and physicians. He suggested six types – excitable, unstable, eccentric, liar, swindler and quarrelsome. The categories were essentially defined by the most disordered criminal offenders observed, distinguished between criminals by impulse, professional criminals, and morbid vagabonds who wandered through life. Kraepelin also described three paranoid (meaning then delusional) disorders, resembling later concepts of schizophrenia, delusional disorder and paranoid personality disorder. A diagnostic term for the latter concept would be included in the DSM from 1952, and from 1980 the DSM would also include schizoid, schizotypal; interpretations of earlier (1921) theories of Ernst Kretschmer led to a distinction between these and another type later included in the DSM, avoidant personality disorder.

In 1933 Russian psychiatrist Pyotr Borisovich Gannushkin published his book Manifestations of Psychopathies: Statics, Dynamics, Systematic Aspects, which was one of the first attempts to develop a detailed typology of psychopathies. Regarding maladaptation, ubiquity, and stability as the three main symptoms of behavioral pathology, he distinguished nine clusters of psychopaths: cycloids (including constitutionally depressive, constitutionally excitable, cyclothymics, and emotionally labile),  (including psychasthenics), schizoids (including dreamers), paranoiacs (including fanatics), epileptoids, hysterical personalities (including pathological liars), unstable psychopaths, antisocial psychopaths, and constitutionally stupid. Some elements of Gannushkin's typology were later incorporated into the theory developed by a Russian adolescent psychiatrist, Andrey Yevgenyevich Lichko, who was also interested in psychopathies along with their milder forms, the so-called accentuations of character.

In 1939, psychiatrist David Henderson published a theory of 'psychopathic states' that contributed to popularly linking the term to anti-social behavior. Hervey M. Cleckley's 1941 text, The Mask of Sanity, based on his personal categorization of similarities he noted in some prisoners, marked the start of the modern clinical conception of psychopathy and its popularist usage.

Towards the mid 20th century, psychoanalytic theories were coming to the fore based on work from the turn of the century being popularized by Sigmund Freud and others. This included the concept of character disorders, which were seen as enduring problems linked not to specific symptoms but to pervasive internal conflicts or derailments of normal childhood development. These were often understood as weaknesses of character or willful deviance, and were distinguished from neurosis or psychosis. The term 'borderline' stems from a belief some individuals were functioning on the edge of those two categories, and a number of the other personality disorder categories were also heavily influenced by this approach, including dependent, obsessive–compulsive and histrionic, the latter starting off as a conversion symptom of hysteria particularly associated with women, then a hysterical personality, then renamed histrionic personality disorder in later versions of the DSM. A passive aggressive style was defined clinically by Colonel William Menninger during World War II in the context of men's reactions to military compliance, which would later be referenced as a personality disorder in the DSM. Otto Kernberg was influential with regard to the concepts of borderline and narcissistic personalities later incorporated in 1980 as disorders into the DSM.

Meanwhile, a more general personality psychology had been developing in academia and to some extent clinically. Gordon Allport published theories of personality traits from the 1920s—and Henry Murray advanced a theory called personology, which influenced a later key advocate of personality disorders, Theodore Millon. Tests were developing or being applied for personality evaluation, including projective tests such as the Rorschach test, as well as questionnaires such as the Minnesota Multiphasic Personality Inventory. Around mid-century, Hans Eysenck was analysing traits and personality types, and psychiatrist Kurt Schneider was popularising a clinical use in place of the previously more usual terms 'character', 'temperament' or 'constitution'.

American psychiatrists officially recognized concepts of enduring personality disturbances in the first Diagnostic and Statistical Manual of Mental Disorders in the 1950s, which relied heavily on psychoanalytic concepts. Somewhat more neutral language was employed in the DSM-II in 1968, though the terms and descriptions had only a slight resemblance to current definitions. The DSM-III published in 1980 made some major changes, notably putting all personality disorders onto a second separate 'axis' along with "mental retardation", intended to signify more enduring patterns, distinct from what were considered axis one mental disorders. 'Inadequate' and 'asthenic' personality disorder' categories were deleted, and others were expanded into more types, or changed from being personality disorders to regular disorders. Sociopathic personality disorder, which had been the term for psychopathy, was renamed Antisocial Personality Disorder. Most categories were given more specific 'operationalized' definitions, with standard criteria psychiatrists could agree on to conduct research and diagnose patients. In the DSM-III revision, self-defeating personality disorder and sadistic personality disorder were included as provisional diagnoses requiring further study. They were dropped in the DSM-IV, though a proposed 'depressive personality disorder' was added; in addition, the official diagnosis of passive–aggressive personality disorder was dropped, tentatively renamed 'negativistic personality disorder.'

International differences have been noted in how attitudes have developed towards the diagnosis of personality disorder. Kurt Schneider argued they were 'abnormal varieties of psychic life' and therefore not necessarily the domain of psychiatry, a view said to still have influence in Germany today. British psychiatrists have also been reluctant to address such disorders or consider them on par with other mental disorders, which has been attributed partly to resource pressures within the National Health Service, as well as to negative medical attitudes towards behaviors associated with personality disorders. In the US, the prevailing healthcare system and psychoanalytic tradition has been said to provide a rationale for private therapists to diagnose some personality disorders more broadly and provide ongoing treatment for them.

See also 

 Depressive personality disorder
 Borderline personality disorder

References

Further reading

External links 

 Personality Disorders Foundation
 National Mental Health Association personality disorder fact sheet
 Personality Disorders information leaflet from The Royal College of Psychiatrists

 
Mental disorders
Psychology